Sonali Vishnu Shingate  (born 27 May 1995) is an Indian professional women's Kabaddi player and the current part of India national kabaddi team. She was part of the national teams which won the gold medal at the South Asian Games 2019 and the silver medal at the 2018 Asian Games.

Early life 
Born in a middle-class family from Maharashtra, Shingate started playing kabaddi after completing her high school education. She training for the game at the Shiv Shakti Mahila Sangha club under coach Rajesh Padave.

Career

National career 
In 2014, Shingate played for Maharashtra's junior team, which lost to Haryana in the quarterfinal.

International career 
Shingate participated in the Asian Games in Indonesia in 2018, in which India won the silver medal. In 2019, she represented India in the 13th South Asian Games that took place in Kathmandu Nepal and won the gold medal.

References

South Asian Games gold medalists for India
Asian Games medalists in kabaddi
Kabaddi players at the 2018 Asian Games
Asian Games silver medalists for India
Medalists at the 2018 Asian Games
Indian kabaddi players
1995 births
Living people
South Asian Games medalists in kabaddi